Harry George Falk Jr. (March 15, 1933 – April 29, 2016) was an American film and television director. He directed the 1969 television film Three's a Crowd.

Early life 
Falk was born in New York City to Irish-Catholic parents. His family moved to California, after his father got a job as a gaffer.

Career 
Falk began his career, as an assistant director on television commercials and for the television series The Defenders, in 1961.

Later in his career, Falk directed for many television programs, as his credits includes, The Patty Duke Show, Get Smart, The Partridge Family, That Girl, Hawaii Five-O, The Streets of San Francisco, The Doris Day Show, The Mod Squad and The Courtship of Eddie's Father. 

In 1975-1989, Falk was nominated for an Primetime Emmy for Outstanding Directing in a Drama Series. He directed some miniseries programs in his career, as directing The Sophisticated Gents, Beulah Land and Centennial. He retired in 1989, as his last work on directing the television film High Desert Kill.

Death 
Falk died in April 2016 at his home in Santa Monica, California, at the age of 83.

References

External links  

1933 births
2016 deaths
American film directors
American television directors
American directors
People from New York City